Marjan is a 1956 Persian language film. It was the first Persian feature film in the history of Iranian cinema to be produced and directed by a Persian woman, Shahla Riahi, a well-known actress and singer. The 110-minute 35mm, black-and-white film was produced by Arya Film. The story, written for the screen by Mohammad Asemi, concerns a tribe of gypsies that settle near a village.

References

1956 films
Iranian drama films
1956 drama films
Iranian black-and-white films